Spellbound Entertainment AG was a German video game developer based in Offenburg. The company is best known for the Desperados series.

They also developed Arcania: Gothic 4, part of the Gothic series and later its expansion, Arcania: Fall of Setarrif. It was Spellbound's first entry into the series, which was previously developed by Piranha Bytes.

History 

Spellbound was founded in 1994 by Armin Gessert.

In 2007, they developed Arcania: Gothic 4, the seventh overall release and second spin-off from the Gothic series.

In 2012 the company went into administration. On 13th July 2012, they were re-founded as Black Forest Games, employing 40 of the former 65 staff members.

Games developed 
 Perry Rhodan: Operation Eastside (1995; Fantasy Productions)
 Desperados: Wanted Dead or Alive (2001; Infogrames)
 Untitled Desperados addon (unreleased)
 Robin Hood: The Legend of Sherwood (2002; Mindscape, Free verse, Wanadoo Edition)
 Airline Tycoon (1998–2003; Infogrames, Monte Cristo, RuneSoft)
 Smoking Colts (2003; Spellbound Entertainment)
 Starsky & Hutch (2003; Empire Interactive)
 Chicago 1930 (2003; Wanadoo Edition)
 Desperados 2: Cooper's Revenge (2006; Atari)
 Helldorado (2007; Viva Media
 Giana Sisters DS (2009; Destineer, DTP Entertainment)
 Arcania: Gothic 4 (2010; JoWooD Entertainment, DreamCatcher Interactive)
 Arcania: Fall of Setarrif (2011; Nordic Games)
 Desperados Gangs (cancelled).

References

External links 
 

Video game development companies
Video game companies established in 1994
Video game companies disestablished in 2012
Defunct video game companies of Germany
German companies established in 1994
German companies disestablished in 2012